Jedaias Capucho Neves (born 15 April 1979), better known as Jeda, is a Brazilian former footballer who played as a striker, and currently head coach of Italian amateur club Vimercatese Oreno.

Playing career
Born in Santarém, Pará, Jeda started his career at União São João. He then signed by Vicenza. He made his Serie A debut against Reggina on  23 December 2000. He then found using a fake passport in order to register as an EU player, he was banned for the first half of 2001–02 season.

He followed the club relegated in summer 2001. He made 3 appearances before moved to A.C. Siena on loan. he then played regularly for Vicenza, but transferred to Palermo in January 2004. He won the Serie B Champions in summer 2004, but transferred to Piacenza of Serie B after became surplus of Palermo Serie A campaign. In January 2005, he moved, this time on loan to league rival Catania.

In summer 2005, he joined F.C. Crotone, where he scored 15 goals. In summer 2006, he was signed by Rimini, where he scored 13 goals in 19 games in 2007–08 season.

In January 2008, he joined Serie A club Cagliari, who was then struggling to keep from relegation. He eventually helped Cagliari recover and maintain their stay at Serie A.

Signing on deadline day in the summer of 2010 from Cagliari, he moved to newly promoted Serie A team Lecce. He scored two goals in the decisive match against Bari on 15 May 2011 which allowed his team to avoid relegation with a game to spare.

After a number of experiences in the minor leagues of Italian football, he retired in 2018 following a season with Eccellenza amateurs Vimercatese Oreno.

Coaching career
After his retirement, he accepted an offer from Vimercatese Oreno to stay at the club on head coaching duty.

Honours
Palermo
Serie B Champions: 2003–04

References

External links
 
 
  CBF

Living people
1979 births
Sportspeople from Pará
Association football forwards
Brazilian footballers
Brazilian expatriate footballers
União São João Esporte Clube players
L.R. Vicenza players
A.C.N. Siena 1904 players
Palermo F.C. players
Piacenza Calcio 1919 players
Catania S.S.D. players
F.C. Crotone players
U.S. Lecce players
Rimini F.C. 1912 players
Cagliari Calcio players
Novara F.C. players
Potenza Calcio players
U.S. Pergolettese 1932 players
Nuorese Calcio players
U.S. 1913 Seregno Calcio players
Serie A players
Serie B players
Serie C players
Serie D players
Expatriate footballers in Italy